The Opel DTM V8 engine family is a series of prototype, four-stroke, 4.0-liter, naturally aspirated DOHC V-8 racing engines, designed, developed and produced by Opel, and specially tuned by German manufacturer Spiess, for the Deutsche Tourenwagen Meisterschaft, between 2000 and 2005.

Applications 
Opel Astra DTM
Opel Vectra GTS V8 DTM

References

V8 engines
Opel engines
Gasoline engines by model
Engines by model
Piston engines
Internal combustion engine